Kadamattathu Kathanar ( a Syriac Orthodox Church priest of Kadamattom church) also known as Kadamattathachan (Father Kadamattom) was a priest (Kathanar) who is believed to have possessed supernatural powers and whose legends are closely related to the beginning of the Kadamattom Church, one of the oldest church buildings that still exists in Kerala the land of Saint Thomas Christians. The church now belongs to the Malankara Orthodox Syrian Church. The church stands on a hill about 30 km from Ernakulam on the Muvattupuzha road. The history of this church was not written down, but lives through legends. The stories about Kadamattathu Kathanar embody the experiences of the people in that area giving expression through magic and sorcery. The stories relating to him tells that he had supernatural powers and being a Christian priest used his magic for the common good.

In medieval legends, history and fables were combined inextricably. The story of Kadamattathu Kathanar might be a mixture of history and fables. Currently there is no certain proof that he really existed, but the fact that a real priest lived in that area in the ninth century cannot be denied. Tradition points out the existence of Christians in the area from 5th century of the Christian Era.

StoryKottarathil Sankunni. EithihyamaalaIythiha Maala (legends of Kerala). Chapter 72. pp 380-391.

Childhood
Poulose later known as karthanar was born in a very poor Syrian Christian family in Kadamattom, a small village in North Travancore (now part of Kerala). People fondly called him Kochu Poulose. He had no siblings and his parents died when he was a child. He was taken care of by his mother for a short period before her death after which he came under the patronage of the Persian priest Mar Abo. Living in a small cottage with no one to look after, he felt depressed, left his home and went to a nearby church. The parish priest who passed that way saw this boy crying and praying on the doorsteps of his church. He took him to his house gave him shelter and food and cared for him like his own child.

Soon the parish priest had realized that this boy was religious, intelligent and efficient. So he was given a good education under a famous teacher. The priest himself took time to teach him Syriac and Liturgy of the Mass. In due course he was ordained as a Deacon and people began to call him Deacon Poulose.

Mastering of Magical Powers
According to a popular legend, a local priest had a herd of cattle which were taken out by a servant boy to the nearby hills for grazing. One day while he was out with the cattle on the hills, a tiger came and killed one of them. Afraid of the tiger the boy ran to the village and told the priest what had happened. The priest and Deacon Poulose, immediately summoned the people in the village and they went out in different directions searching for the cattle. By sunset all the cattle returned, except the one that was killed by the tiger.

But soon the priest realized that Deacon Poulose, who went in search of the cattle, did not return. Search parties went out in different directions that night. But there was no sign of the deacon. Days passed by, still he had not returned.  Though the villagers thought that he was killed by the tiger, the priest believed that he was still alive somewhere.

Paulose had actually lost his way in the deep forest which eventually led him to a group of ancient tribals. It is believed that he mastered his magical powers from these cannibal tribes known as Mala Arayas living in subterranean abodes. Their leader who became fond of Paulose, allowed him to stay with them for many years during which he learned the secrets of magical performances.

Paulose later escaped from there after which the Mala Arayas searched for him in vain. It is believed that Kathanar escaped by staying in the church when the cannibal tribes created a storm in their effort to destroy the church and capture him. The scars said to be generated by the storm are still visible on the walls of the church.

Mar Sabor the Bishop who ordained him as a priest left from Kadamattom after the arrival of Paulose. The Bishop built many churches, Kayamkulam and finally settled at Thevalakkara, his tomb inside the Martha Mariam Church Thevalakkara.

It is difficult to detail all the great deeds in the life of Kadamattathu Kathanar as not many verifiable records exist. He has written a number of books on sorcery but his writings are not legible and is incomprehensible to the lay reader.

Last days And Possessions
Neither his date of birth nor his date of death are known.

Gallery

In Media
 In the 1966 film Kadamattathachan, Prem Nazir played the lead role.
 A popular TV series Kadamattathu Kathanar was telecasted by Asianet in which actor Prakash Paul played Kathanar.
 A similar TV series was produced by Jai Hind television channel and by Surya TV (titled Kadamattathachan). Prakash Paul played the title role in both.
 Past films and TV series had inaccurately portrayed Kadamattathu Kathanar as a Capuchin priest. He was a priest in the Church of the East. Hence he wore the traditional attire of priests from the Assyrian church such as the phiro (a small black cap) and the black robe. 
 In the movie Megasandesam cast by Suresh Gopi & Samyuktha Varma actor Napoleon plays the role of a descendant of Kadamattathu Kathanar.
 On February 14, 2020 Friday Film House announced a movie called Kathanar - The Wild Sorcerer: Part 1 which is based on the character starring actor Jayasurya in the titular role.

See also
Kottarathil Sankunni
Yakshi

References

Further reading
Kottarathil Sankunni, Aithihyamaala (legends of Kerala in Malayalam). Current Books. 1909. .
Mathew, N.M. Malankara Marthoma Sabha Charitram, (History of the Marthoma Church), Volume 1. Tiruvalla. 2006.

Kerala folklore
Legendary Indian people
Syriac Orthodox clergy